The Gigantes are a race of giants in Greek mythology. 

Gigantes may also refer to:

Places
 Los Gigantes, a resort town on  Canary Island, Tenerife
 Islas de Gigantes, an island chain in the Philippines
 Las islas de los Gigantes, a name given by Christopher Columbus to the ABC islands

Sports teams
 Gigantes de Carolina (disambiguation)
 Gigantes del Cibao, a Dominican Winter League baseball team
 Gigantes de Guayana, a Venezuelan basketball team
 Gigantes del Sur, an Argentine volleyball team

People
 Evelyn Gigantes (born 1942), Canadian former politician
 Philippe Gigantès (1923–2004), Greek journalist, war correspondent, Korean War prisoner of war, author, television commentator, Greek Minister of Culture and Canadian senator
 Gigantes, a ring name of American professional wrestler Jerry Tuite (1966–2003)

Other uses
 Gigantes y cabezudos, costumed figures in Spanish festivals
 Os Gigantes (The Giants), a Brazilian telenovela which aired from 1979 to 1980
 "Gigantes" (song), a 2014 song by Spanish singer Ruth Lorenzo

See also
 Gigantes or gigandes plaki, a Greek bean dish
 Gigante (disambiguation)